Babylon A.D. is an American hard rock band formed in 1987. Babylon A.D. hail from the San Francisco Bay Area, California, United States. In 1989, Babylon A.D. caught the attention of Arista Records president and industry music mogul Clive Davis, who signed them at a live showcase in Los Angeles. The band's first lineup was Derek Davis on vocals, guitarists John Mathews and Ron Freschi, drummer Jamey Pacheco and bassist Robb Reid.

The debut album, Babylon A.D., was released in 1989, and included the hard rock songs "Bang Go the Bells", "Hammer Swings Down" and "The Kid Goes Wild", the latter used as the trailer song and video for the Orion Pictures movie RoboCop 2. Their sophomore effort, Nothing Sacred, released in 1992, produced two singles, "Bad Blood" and "So Savage the Heart". The band toured throughout the early 1990s and put several videos on MTV.

After spending several years with Arista, the band signed with Apocalypse Records in 1999 and released Live in Your Face, a compilation of live tracks recorded at various cities throughout the United States. The band's next release American Blitzkrieg, followed in 2002. In 2006, the band released In The Beginning... Persuaders Recordings 8688 on Apocalypse/Perris Records, which contained songs from the original demo tapes that secured them their record deal with Arista Records.

In between breaks in the band, Davis released three more records. In 2005 he and band member Jamey Pacheco released a blues rock album with the band American Blues Box. In 2012, Davis released his first studio effort (Re-Volt). In 2014, Davis's band Moonshine was released, a blues based rock band which was recorded at Eddie Van Halen's 5150 studios with guest appearances by Michael Anthony and Jane Child.

Freschi was also busy during this time recording and releasing his own band's debut Syrym in 2007.

After a long hiatus, Babylon A.D. regrouped with all original members and released a four-song EP Lost Sessions / Fresno, CA 93 in 2014. The band also played several shows in the U.S. and Nottingham, England's FireFest Rock Festival.
 
In 2015 the band released LIVE@XXV to celebrate their 25 years of recording and performing together. They played on the 2015 Monsters of Rock Cruise, along with Bay Area favorites Y&T, Tesla and Night Ranger as well as other play more select dates across the U.S.

Revelation Highway was issued on Frontiers Records on November 10, 2017, and Davis spoke to The Rockpit about the making of the album and the return of original guitarist John Matthews.

Personnel

Current members
 Derek Davis – lead vocals, guitars, piano, Songwriter
 Ron Freschi – guitars, backing vocals
 Danny De La Rosa – guitars, banjo, backing vocals
 Robb Reid – bass guitar, backing vocals
 James "Jamey" Pacheco – drums, percussion

Former members
 John "Jones" Mathew – guitars, keyboards, backing vocals
 Eric Pacheco – bass guitar, backing vocals (died December 6, 2020, aged 53)

Discography

Studio albums
 Babylon A.D. (1989)
 Nothing Sacred (1992)
 American Blitzkrieg (2000)
 Revelation Highway (2017)

Live albums
 Live in Your Face (1998)
 Live@XXV (2015)

Compilation albums
 In the Beginning... Persuaders Recordings 8688 (2006)

Extended plays
 Lost Sessions / Fresno, CA 93 (2014)

Promotional EPs
 Live at the Roxy (1991)

Singles
 "Hammer Swings Down" (1989)
 "Bang Go the Bells" (1990)
 "Desperate" (1991)
 "The Kid Goes Wild" (1991)
 "So Savage the Heart" (1992)
 "Bad Blood" (1992)
 "American Blitzkrieg" (2001)
 "Sinking in the Sand" (2001)
 "Crash and Burn" (2017)
 "One Million Miles" (2017)

Promotional singles
 "Slave Your Body" (1992)
 "So Savage the Heart" (1992)

See also
List of glam metal bands and artists

References

External links

 

Glam metal musical groups from California
Musical groups established in 1987
Musical groups from San Francisco